Phryganopsis alberici is a moth in the subfamily Arctiinae. It was described by Abel Dufrane in 1945. It is found in the Democratic Republic of the Congo.

References

Moths described in 1945
Lithosiini
Endemic fauna of the Democratic Republic of the Congo